"Starstrukk" is a song recorded by American group 3OH!3. It is their third single and their second single to be released from their second studio album, Want (2008). A radio-only and the deluxe album version has been released featuring singer Katy Perry. The version featuring Perry had considerable success worldwide, peaking within the top ten of the charts in Australia, Belgium (Wallonia), Finland, Poland, the Republic of Ireland, and the United Kingdom. It is the follow-up to their debut single "Don't Trust Me".

Background and release
3OH!3 was among the line-up of the Warped Tour 2008 where they met Katy Perry. The band then toured with her on the United Kingdom dates of her Hello Katy Tour in February 2009. They said of Perry's participation to the song: "Katy did this because we toured with Katy, we are good friends with Katy and we worked on the song together — we worked on the remix together." "Starstrukk" was chosen as the second single of their second studio album Want (2008). It impacted the US contemporary hit radio format on August 4, 2009. A remix version featuring American singer and songwriter Katy Perry was released next month, on September 14. Perry later included this remix on the deluxe edition of her third studio album Teenage Dream while 3OH!3 included this remix on the international edition of their third studio album Streets of Gold.

Music videos

The music video for the song was premiered by AOL on Monday, June 8, 2009. A "behind the scenes" of the music video has been released prior to the release date. It was filmed in Los Angeles, California and directed by Sum 41's drummer, Steve Jocz. According to Rolling Stone, the video showcases throngs of girls dressed in fluorescent wardrobe chasing 3OH!3, a large clothed orgy with construction workers, a marching band and copious amounts of whipped cream. Jocz said the concept is a bunch of people getting clustered together until the eventually formed a massive dogpile. According to group member, Sean Foreman, "the video is looking awesome."

Sean Foreman commented on the video to an interview with MTV. He said the following:

The second music video for "Starstrukk", which was directed by Marc Klasfeld and Steve Jocz, and includes Katy Perry, was shot at the Los Angeles County Natural History Museum's Rose Garden in Exposition Park on Monday, September 21, 2009. The video shows 3OH!3 sitting at a fountain where they retrieve coins that have been thrown in, causing women to begin pursuing them. In other scenes, Perry and 3OH!3 sing together in front of the fountain. During her verse, Perry dances underneath the fountain at night. The story treatment in the video is mostly taken from the film When in Rome, with the theme of magical coins thrown into a fountain. The video also references James Bond films, West Side Story and Baywatch.

Usage in media and cover versions
"Starstrukk" was featured on the third episode of the first season of The Vampire Diaries. It was also used in When in Rome. The song was covered by Marina and the Diamonds on BBC Radio 1's Live Lounge in the United Kingdom, and at a few of her live performances, including the Glastonbury Festival. A studio recording of her cover was included as the B-side to her 2010 single "Oh No!".

Charts

Weekly charts

Year-end charts

Certifications

Release history

References

2009 singles
2009 songs
3OH!3 songs
Katy Perry songs
Marina Diamandis songs
Music videos directed by Marc Klasfeld
Songs about casual sex
Songs written by Nathaniel Motte
Songs written by Sean Foreman
Photo Finish Records singles
Capitol Records singles